Kathleen Shirley Toulson ( Dixon; 20 May 192423 September 2018) was an English writer, poet, journalist and local politician. 

Toulson attended Prior's Field School and worked with the Auxiliary Territorial Service during World War II.  She married Norman Toulson, an army lieutenant, in 1944: they divorced in 1951. She then studied English at  Birkbeck, University of London, and worked at Foyles bookshop before becoming a journalist. In 1960 she married poet Alan Brownjohn; they divorced in 1969.

As a poet she was a member of The Group, an informal group of poets who met in London from the mid-1950s to the mid-1960s. Her work was included in the group's 1963 anthology A Group Anthology.

In 1962 she and her husband Alan Brownjohn were elected as Labour councillors in the Wandsworth London Borough Council.

Her 1973 short story 'Playground of England', appearing in the Welsh journal Planet, satirized the objectification of Wales as a tourist destination by English second home owners.

Starting in 1977 with her book The Drovers’ Roads of Wales, Toulson was the author of several books on the subject of walking routes used by farmers moving livestock from Wales to England. She contributed a profile of the novelist Christine Brooke-Rose for a 1986 reference publication.<ref>'Christine Brooke-Rose', in D. L. Kirkpatrick, ed., Contemporary Novelists', London: St James Press, 1986, 4th ed.</ref>

BooksShadows in an Orchard (1960)Circumcision's Not Such a Bad Thing After All (1970)The Fault, Dear Brutus: A Zodiac of Sonnets (1972)The Drovers’ Roads of Wales (1977)East Anglia: Walking the Ley Lines and Ancient Tracks (1979)Celtic Journeys (1985)
 The Companion Guide to Devon (1996)The Country of Old Age: A Personal Adventure in Time'' (1998)

References

Further reading
 

1924 births
2018 deaths
20th-century English women writers
20th-century British women politicians
20th-century English poets
Alumni of Birkbeck, University of London
People educated at Prior's Field School
English women poets
Councillors in the London Borough of Wandsworth
Women councillors in England
Auxiliary Territorial Service soldiers